Thomas Joseph Delaney (born 3 September 1991) is a Danish professional footballer, who plays as a defensive midfielder for German  club 1899 Hoffenheim, on loan from the La Liga club Sevilla, and the Denmark national team.

Delaney began his career at Copenhagen, making 249 total appearances and scoring 24 goals, while winning the Danish Superliga five times and the Danish Cup on four occasions. He then played in Germany for Werder Bremen and Borussia Dortmund, making 107 total Bundesliga appearances before a move to Sevilla in 2021.

Delaney made his international debut for Denmark in 2013. He was part of their squads at the 2018 FIFA World Cup, UEFA Euro 2020 and the 2022 World Cup, reaching the semi-finals of the 2020 tournament.

Club career

Copenhagen

Delaney started playing youth football at Kjøbenhavns Boldklub, the reserve team of Danish club F.C. Copenhagen.

Delaney made his debut for Copenhagen in an unofficial friendly in August 2008. After playing the first half of the 2008–09 season in the KB youth team, he was a part of the FCK squad in the Danish Cup that campaign. He made his official debut in the first leg of the semi-finals against Nordvest FC in April, where he substituted Hjalte Nørregaard in the middle of second half. In the return leg two weeks later Delaney was among the starting eleven playing the first 60 minutes before he was substituted with Şaban Özdoğan.

In the summer break 2009, he was promoted to the first team squad together with Özdoğan. He scored on his continental debut on 22 July 2009, playing the full second leg in Copenhagen's Champions League second qualifying round victory over FK Mogren. His first Superliga match was on 9 August 2009 against SønderjyskE replacing Atiba Hutchinson near the end of the match. On 29 December 2011, signed a contract extension keeping him at Copenhagen until the end of 2014. At the time, Delaney had the distinction of being the longest serving current player at the club, despite being only 20.

On 6 July 2013, Delaney extended his contract with the club to 2015. At the same time, he got jersey number 8. In the following season, he became a regular starter in his favorite position, including UEFA Champions League matches against Juventus F.C., Real Madrid and Galatasaray. On 23 January 2014, he again extended his contract, until 2017. At the same time, he was officially named vice-captain of the team. Half a year later, Delaney was promoted to club captain.

On 14 May 2015 he was named Man of the Match as his side won the Danish Cup final 3–2 after extra-time against fellow Superliga side FC Vestsjælland.

On 27 September 2016, Delaney contributed to a comfortable 4–0 victory for his side with a left-footed half-volley from 30 yards against Belgian side Club Brugge KV in the UEFA Champions League.
The goal came third in the vote for goal of the season in the UEFA Champions League.

Werder Bremen
On 17 August 2016, Werder Bremen announced Delaney would be joining the club in January 2017. On 18 February 2017, he scored his first goal for the club, a free kick, in Werder Bremen's 2–0 win away to Mainz 05 before being stretchered off the pitch with a suspected concussion. It was the club's first win of the new year following four straight defeats.

On 1 April 2017, Delaney scored a hat-trick, the first of his career, in Werder Bremen's 5–2 win away against SC Freiburg.

Borussia Dortmund
On 7 June 2018, Delaney signed for Borussia Dortmund on a four-year contract. The transfer fee paid to Werder Bremen was reported as €20 million.

On 13 May 2021, Delaney was a second-half substitute for Dortmund in their 4–1 victory over RB Leipzig in the 2021 DFB-Pokal Final.

Sevilla
On 25 August 2021, Delaney moved to Spain to join La Liga side Sevilla on a four-year deal for a fee reported by Diario de Sevilla as €7 million.

Loan to Hoffenheim
On 30 January 2023, Delaney returned to Germany and joined 1899 Hoffenheim on loan until the end of the 2022–23 season.

International career
Delaney made his debut for the Denmark under-18 team in October 2008, and went on to play three matches in total. He played 11 games for the Denmark U-19 team. On 11 August 2010, he made his debut for the Denmark U-21 team in a friendly against the Italy U-21 team.

Delaney made his debut for the senior national team on 15 October 2013 in a 2014 FIFA World Cup qualification match against Malta. He played the full 90 minutes of the 6–0 home win. His second cap did not come until 25 March 2015, as a half-time substitute in a 3–2 friendly win over the United States in Aarhus.

Delaney scored his first international goal on 1 September 2017 to open a 4–0 home win over Poland in 2018 FIFA World Cup qualification. Three days later, he scored a hat-trick as the team came from behind to win 4–1 away to Armenia.

In June 2018, he was named in Denmark's squad for the World Cup in Russia. He was also named in the 26-man squad for UEFA Euro 2020. He scored the first goal in the 2–1 quarter-final game against the Czech Republic.

Personal life
Delaney was born in Denmark and spent his youth there. His father was also born in Denmark but has American citizenship due to his own father (Thomas Delaney's paternal grandfather) being born in the United States. Delaney also has Irish roots through his paternal great-grandfather who moved from Ireland to the United States in the 19th century during the Great Famine.

Delaney is red–green colour blind.

Career statistics

Club

International

Scores and results list Denmark's goal tally first.

Honours
Copenhagen
 Danish Superliga: 2009–10, 2010–11, 2012–13, 2015–16, 2016–17
 Danish Cup: 2011–12, 2014–15, 2015–16, 2016–17

Borussia Dortmund
 DFB-Pokal: 2020–21
 DFL-Supercup: 2019

Individual
 Arla's Talent Award: 2009
 Danish Cup Fighter: 2015
 F.C. Copenhagen Player of the Year: 2015, 2016

References

External links

Danish national team profile 
F.C. Copenhagen profile 

Profile at Football-Lineups.com

1991 births
Living people
Sportspeople from Frederiksberg
Association football forwards
Danish men's footballers
Danish people of Irish descent
Danish people of American descent
F.C. Copenhagen players
SV Werder Bremen players
Borussia Dortmund players
Sevilla FC players
TSG 1899 Hoffenheim players
Danish Superliga players
Bundesliga players
La Liga players
Denmark youth international footballers
Denmark under-21 international footballers
Denmark international footballers
2018 FIFA World Cup players
UEFA Euro 2020 players
2022 FIFA World Cup players
Danish expatriate men's footballers
Danish expatriate sportspeople in Germany
Expatriate footballers in Germany
Danish expatriate sportspeople in Spain
Expatriate footballers in Spain